Agathis borneensis, also known as Borneo kauri, is a species of conifer in the family Araucariaceae.

Description
The Borneo kauri grows to a maximum height of 50 metres. It has a long narrow cone and dark green leaves. The closest relative of this species is Agathis dammara.

Taxonomy
A 1998 IUCN assessment of Agathis dammara regarded Agathis borneensis as a synonym. IUCN assessor Aljos Farjon now treats A. borneensis as a distinct species. In his IUCN assessments of 1998 and 2010, Farjon assessed Agathis endertii as a separate species. However, as of 2013, he considers A. endertii synonymous with A. borneensis.

Distribution and habitat
Agathis borneensis is native to Sumatra, Peninsular Malaysia and Borneo.

References

External links

 Agathis borneensis - Wageningen University; Forest Ecology and Forest Management Group

borneensis
Trees of Sumatra
Trees of Peninsular Malaysia
Trees of Borneo
Flora of the Borneo montane rain forests
Flora of the Borneo lowland rain forests